The Reading and Leeds Festivals are a pair of annual music festivals that take place in Reading and Leeds, England. The events both happen on the bank holiday weekend in August (on Friday, Saturday, Sunday), and share the same bill (occasionally with one or two exceptions). The festival's origins date to the Beaulieu Jazz Festival (1956–1961) which became the National Jazz Festival in 1961 (The National Jazz and Blues Festival in 1963) and settled in Reading in 1971. In 1999 a second leg was added at Leeds.

The following is a list of acts that have played at the festival.

1961

Main stage

1962

Main stage

1963

Main stage

Notes
The third NJF Festival saw the first non-Jazz acts appear, notably the Rolling Stones and Long John Baldry on the Sunday afternoon. The Sunday afternoon session featured the final heats of the National Amateur Jazz Contest featuring twelve jazz bands chosen from semi-finals held across Britain.

1964

Main stage

Notes
The Festival expanded to three days with the addition of a rhythm & blues themed Friday evening session. The Sunday afternoon session featured the fourteen best jazz bands from a National Amateur Jazz Contest chosen from regional contests held nationwide.

1965

Main stage

1966

Main stage

Notes
The Festival moved to the larger Windsor Racecourse venue in 1966 after five years at Richmond Athletic Ground. Cream were billed as 'Eric Clapton – Jack Bruce – Ginger Baker' as the band were still unnamed when promotional posters & advertising were printed.

1967

Main stage

Marquee stage

Notes
Pink Floyd pulled out on Saturday evening due to singer/guitarist Syd Barrett's health problems and were replaced by The Nice. The Nice also acted as backing band for P P Arnold. A second "Marquee" stage was added on Saturday and Sunday evenings. Four bands played sets each night, three of which also appeared on the main stage on the same day.

1968

Main stage

1969

Main stage

1970

Main stage

Village stage

Notes
The 1970 Festival was a four-day event for the only time in its history, with a South of England Local Talent session in the main arena on the Thursday evening. A 'Village' stage was added on Saturday and Sunday running from later afternoon to mid-evening.

1971

Main stage

Notes
In 1971 the Festival moved to its permanent home at Little John's Farm on the south bank of the River Thames in Reading, a venue it has remained at ever since (with the exception of two years in the 1980s when the Festival was banned by the Conservative Party controlled Reading Borough Council).

1972

Main stage

1973

Main stage

Notes
Roy Buchanan and Bert Jansch were scheduled to appear, but they did not play.

1974

Main stage

1975

Main stage

1976

Main stage

1977

Main stage

Notes
Frankie Miller, Widowmaker, Racing Cars, Blue, Tiger, and Hand Reef all made appearances, but their place on the lineup is unclear.

1978

Main stage

1979

Main stage

Notes
Thin Lizzy were scheduled to headline on Saturday but cancelled. After the Fire and The Ramones were also scheduled to play but cancelled.

1980

Main stage

Notes
Angel City withdrew and were replaced by Grand Prix, Q-Tips also pulled out, being replaced by White Spirit. Gary Moore's G-Force were also originally scheduled to play but cancelled. Headboys (replaced by Quartz) and Ozzy Osbourne's Blizzard of Ozz (replaced by Slade) were also cancellations, while The Pencils pulled out at the last minute when all of their equipment was stolen the night before.

1981

Main stage

Notes
Thompson Twins, Midnight Oil, Outlaws, The Marshall Tucker Band and Alex Harvey Band were originally scheduled to play but cancelled. Stan Webb's Chicken Shack pulled out due to illness and were replaced at short notice by Atomic Rooster.

1982

Main stage

1983

Main stage

1984
The 1984 Festival was cancelled when the Conservative Party took control of Reading Borough Council. The announced line-up was due to be:

Main stage

1985
No festival held this year

1986

Main stage

1987

Main stage

1988

Main stage

1989

Main stage

Mean Fiddler stage

1990

Main stage

Mean Fiddler stage

1991

Main stage

Mean Fiddler stage

Comedy stage

1992

Main stage

Melody Maker stage

Comedy stage

1993

Main stage

Melody Maker stage

Comedy stage

1994

Main stage

Melody Maker stage

Comedy stage

Notes
Soundgarden were due to play but cancelled when Chris Cornell was diagnosed with polyps on his vocal cords.

1995

Main stage

Melody Maker stage

Carlsberg stage

Comedy stage

1996

Main stage

NME stage

Dr. Martens Stage

Notes
Despite being billed as headliners on the Friday night, Rage Against the Machine played their set before The Prodigy

1997

Main stage

Dr. Martens Stage

Melody Maker stage

Vans Warped Tour stage

1998

Main stage

Melody Maker stage

Dr. Martens Stage

Carlsberg Export stage

Notes
Curve were due to play on the Melody Maker stage on the Sunday but were replaced by Theaudience at short notice.

1999

Main stage

Radio 1 Evening Session stage

Carling Premier stage
Liberty 37 (unknown position)

Also included Big Leaves, Black Box Recorder, Cha Cha Cohen, Chicks, Cube, Cyclefly, Dark Star, Dawn of the Replicants, Experimental Pop Band, The Jellys, Jim's Super Stereo World, Linoleum, Llama Farmers, Medal, Mercedes, The Motorhomes, Muse, Peeps Into Fairyland, Quasi, Rico, The Rocking Horses, Rosita, Seafood, Silt, Sonia Fariq, Stroke, Venni, The Webb Brothers, Witness

Dance stage

Vans Warped Tour stage

Notes
Orgy were due to open the Main Stage Reading Sunday/Leeds Monday, but pulled out days before the event. Lit filled in their spot.

2000

Main stage

Radio 1 Evening Session stage

Dance stage

Carling Premier stage

Notes
Rage Against the Machine played their last UK gig at Reading before their break-up. They played their last gig three weeks later. Originally booked play on the mainstage Eminem had to pull out a few weeks prior due to legal reasons in America. Elastica pulled out of their Leeds appearance.

2001

Main stage

Radio 1 Evening Session stage

The End Dance stage

The Concrete Jungle stage

Carling stage

Notes
This was the year that the Concrete Jungle Stage made its debut. Weekend tickets cost £80, day tickets £35. The Strokes were moved from the Radio One stage to the Main Stage.

2002

Main stage

Radio 1 Evening Session stage

Third stage

Carling stage

Notes
Guns N' Roses played only in Leeds as they had a prior touring commitment in London on the day of the Reading event. In Reading they were replaced by Raging Speedhorn who appeared much lower on the bill. A weekend ticket cost £90, a day ticket was £39. Reel Big Fish pulled out of Leeds for undisclosed reasons. Antipop Consortium cancelled their Dance Stage appearance after they disbanded earlier that month. Feeder were invited by Melvin Benn to headline the main stage on the first day at Reading and the second day at Leeds. They later turned this down, as they did not want to play such a high-profile slot so soon after the death of their drummer Jon Lee in January of that year. As a result, Feeder would instead headline the Radio 1 Evening Session Stage.

2003

Main stage

Radio 1 stage

Smirnoff Dance Arena

The Concrete Jungle stage

Carling stage

Notes
Black Rebel Motorcycle Club played as a replacement for The White Stripes, who pulled out after Jack White was in a car crash with his then-girlfriend, Renée Zellweger. Although they played second on the Main Stage, it was billed as with Black Rebel Motorcycle Club, reflecting their smaller status. Jay-Z also pulled out, with The Darkness moving further up the bill to replace him. The Libertines were without Pete Doherty, who was at that time estranged from the band; he also missed their 2004 appearance. Other drop outs included Courtney Love, Lostprophets and Godsmack. A weekend ticket cost £95, a day ticket £40.

2004

Main stage

Radio 1 stage

Dance Arena

Concrete Jungle stage

Carling stage

Notes
On the Radio 1 Stage, the Super Furry Animals headlined on the Leeds Saturday, with Graham Coxon second. This order was reversed when the bands played the Reading Friday. New Found Glory pulled out a few weeks before the festival. A weekend ticket cost £105, a day ticket £45.

2005

Main stage

NME/Radio 1 Stage

Dance Arena

Radio 1 Lock-Up Stage

Carling stage

Notes
In 2005 My Chemical Romance played Reading and Leeds on the same day, in an alteration from the original schedule, due to the MTV Video Music Awards. The Transplants were originally booked to play the festivals but pulled out in mid-August due to illness. Jimmy Eat World also pulled out due to other commitments. Other drop outs included Willy Mason, Simple Plan and Fall Out Boy (also due to the VMAs). A weekend ticket cost £125, a day ticket £60.

2006

Main stage

Radio 1 stage

Dance Arena

Radio 1 Lock-Up Stage

Carling stage

Nokia Tent

Notes
Shortly after the first line-up announcement, Feeder and Yeah Yeah Yeahs switched days, meaning that Yeah Yeah Yeahs would play Reading on Friday and Leeds on Saturday, and that Feeder would play Reading on Saturday and Leeds on Sunday. Audioslave pulled out of their slot due to the band being busy recording new material, The Shins pulled out for undisclosed reasons, and From First to Last pulled out due to the then lead singer (Sonny Moore) needing throat surgery, Paramore had to pull out because their singer (Hayley Williams) had throat problems and were replaced by Sonic Boom Six lower in the bill. Story of the Year and Bleeding Through also pulled out for undisclosed reasons. Flogging Molly played twice at both festivals, once in the punk tent and once on the main stage. Tickets were £135 for a weekend ticket and £60 for a day ticket.

2007

Main stage

Radio 1 stage

The Dance Arena

Radio 1 Lock-Up Stage

The Carling stage

Notes
Kaiser Chiefs played a secret slot on the Carling Stage at the Leeds leg of the event under the pseudonym of 'Hooks for Hands'.
Peeping Tom were due to perform on the dance stage, but pulled out.
+44 also dropped out. A weekend ticket cost £145 (plus a maximum of £7 booking fee).

2008
The line-up for the Reading and Leeds 2008 festivals was announced on 31 March 2008, and tickets were made available thereafter.

Main stage

Radio 1/NME Stage

Festival Republic stage

The Dance Arena

Radio 1 Lock-Up Stage

Alternative stage

BBC Introducing Stage

Notes
The festival ran from Friday 22 – Sunday 24 August 2008. Weekend tickets cost £155. Day tickets cost £65.
Set Your Goals pulled out of the festival. Alkaline Trio pulled mainland festival appearances but still appeared at Reading/Leeds.
The Pigeon Detectives appeared on the Dance to the Radio Stage (an alias for the BBC Introducing Stage in reference to their label) on Thursday 21st at the Leeds Site.
Slipknot pulled out of the festival after drummer Joey Jordison broke his ankle. Feeder were their replacement as far as the slot was concerned, as almost every act below them were moved up a slot, with Bring Me the Horizon being booked instead, although not taking their slot and being at the bottom of the schedule.
Avenged Sevenfold performed a shortened set at Leeds and pulled out of the Reading leg due to illness. Due to the short notice, they were not replaced and the schedule was re-arranged. This meant Mindless Self Indulgence playing before Feeder, although this not an official 4th and are still retroactively listed as the second band to play.

2009

Main stage

Radio 1/NME Stage

Lock Up Stage/Dance Arena

Festival Republic stage

The Alternative stage 
Comedy: Doug Stanhope, Tim Minchin, Brendon Burns, Jack Whitehall, Junior Simpson, Sarah Millican, Tom Stade, Hugh Lennon, MC Matt Read, MC Martin Bigpig, Steve Gribbin, Kevin Bridges, Holly Walsh, Stephen Grant, Markus Birdman, Stuckey & Murray, Jessica Delfino, Dan Nightingale, Gary Delaney, Mark Olver, Daniel Townes, MC Dave Twentyman, Joey Page, Doc Brown, Jamie Kilstein, Joe Bor, Tomb.

Spoken Word: Aidan Moffat, The PeteBox, Kae Tempest, Mik Artistik, John Berkavitch

Debate: ID Instigate Debate

Late Night Entertainment: Smash N' Grab, Swap-A-Rama, Transgressive Records

Film: Le Donk screening plus Q&A session with Mark Herbert and special guests from the film, 3D Night Of The Living Dead, This Is Spinal Tap, Anvil! The Story of Anvil.

Dance to the Radio stage

Notes
The festival ran from Friday 28 August 2009 – Sunday 30 August 2009. Weekend tickets cost £175. Day tickets cost £70.
Alexisonfire and The Bronx (band) played two sets at both Reading and Leeds – one on the Main Stage and one later in the day on the Lock Up stage.
A Day to Remember cancelled their appearance on the Festival Republic stage.
A schedule gap on the Radio1/NME stage on the Friday at Leeds and Saturday at Reading was filled by a surprise appearance by Them Crooked Vultures.

2010
The line-up for the Reading and Leeds 2010 festivals was announced on 29 March 2010, and tickets were made available thereafter.

Main stage

NME/Radio 1 Stage

Lock-Up Stage/Dance Arena

Festival Republic stage

Notes
Miike Snow pulled out for undisclosed reasons, with The Joy Formidable replacing them.
Fight Like Apes and Alberta Cross pulled out of their slots due to undisclosed reasons.
RX Bandits pulled out due to 'unavoidable family circumstances with Cerebral Ballzy replacing them.
Crime In Stereo pulled out due to the band splitting up, with Random Hand replacing them.

2011
The line-up for the Reading and Leeds 2011 festivals was announced on 21 March 2011, and tickets were made available thereafter.

Main stage

NME/Radio 1 Stage

Lock-Up Stage/Dance Stage

Festival Republic stage

Notes
Weekend tickets cost £192.50 before booking fees.
Pulp headlined over The Strokes at the Leeds Festival.
Mouthwash pulled out due to the split up of the band, they were replaced by Fighting Fiction.
The Twilight Singers pulled out and were replaced by Young Legionnaire. OFWGKTA pulled out of the Leeds Festival due to the 2011 MTV Video Music Awards, but still performed at the Reading Festival. Jane's Addiction were due to headline the NME/Radio 1 Stage but cancelled both their appearances at the last minute – after arriving at the Reading site – due to frontman Perry Farrell falling ill. Rise Against played a secret acoustic set on the BBC Introducing Stage at Reading after their mainstage slot.

2012
The initial line-up announcements for the festivals were made on 12 March 2012 – with the tickets made available for purchase shortly afterwards.

Main stage

NME/Radio 1 Stage

Festival Republic stage

Lock Up/Dance Stage

Notes
Chiddy Bang pulled out of the festival due to touring commitments, and were replaced by Hadouken!
Here We Go Magic pulled out of the festival for undisclosed reasons. Their replacement was Future of the Left.
Green Day played a secret gig at Reading Festival.

2013

Main stage

NME/Radio 1 Stage

BBC Radio 1 Dance stage

Lock Up/Rock Stage

Festival Republic stage

BBC Radio 1Xtra stage

Notes
 The latest announcements to the 2013 Reading and Leeds festival were made on Tuesday, 4 June 2013 on Radio 1
 Reading and Leeds 2013 presale tickets went on sale on 30 August 2012. Weekend tickets were made available on 30 November 2012 at a price of £202.50 (plus an £8 booking fee). Day tickets cost £90.00 (plus a £7 booking fee).
 Early entry tickets for the Reading site sold out on 17 June 2013. On 5 July 2013, Saturday day tickets for the Reading site sold out. On 12 July 2013, Friday day tickets for the Reading site sold out. On 23 July 2013, weekend tickets for the Reading site sold out. On 13 August 2013, Sunday tickets sold out, meaning at the Reading site, the full weekend was sold out. On 17 August 2013, Friday tickets for the Leeds site sold out.
 On 27 June 2013, Brand New, who were due to play on the Main Stage announced that they were cancelling their August European dates including their performances at the Reading and Leeds Festivals. They were replaced by EarlWolf.
 Iggy Azalea cancelled in order to attend the MTV Video Music Awards.
 Due to illness, DIIV were forced to cancel Reading and Leeds performances.

2014

Main stage

NME/Radio 1 Stage

BBC Radio 1 Dance stage

The Pit/Lock Up

Festival Republic stage

Radio 1Xtra stage

2015

Main stage

NME/Radio 1 Stage

BBC Radio 1 Dance stage

The Pit/Lock Up

Festival Republic stage

BBC Radio 1 Xtra stage

Notes
Tyler the Creator had originally been booked to play on the NME Stage, but was forced to cancel these shows after being refused entry into the United Kingdom. Modern Baseball had planned to play the Lock Up Stage, but withdrew the week before the festival due to the lead singer's decision to focus on tackling his depression. Mastodon had originally been booked to headline the Pit stage, but pulled out when they cancelled their European tour, citing a 'personal family matter.' It was later revealed that this was due to bassist Troy Sanders' wife being diagnosed with breast cancer.

2016

Main stage

NME/Radio 1 Stage

BBC Radio 1 Dance stage

The Pit/Lock Up

Festival Republic stage

Radio 1Xtra stage

Notes
Parkway Drive had pulled out of Leeds due to 'family issues', this meant that Skindred played for a full hour while a new band called Judas played the rest of the time slot. A$AP Rocky pulled out of Leeds festival at the last possible moment due to travel problems. He was however capable to perform at Reading. Fetty Wap was due to play on the NME stage, but had to pull out from doctors orders due to a severe ear infection. HAIM were supposed to play on the NME stage but cancelled their European tour to focus on finishing their second album. G-Eazy who was one of the headliners for the Radio 1Xtra stage pulled out of the festival for unforeseen circumstances, and was replaced by Wiley. Travis Scott was also a headliner for the Radio 1Xtra stage, cancelled all remaining UK tour shows also due to unforeseen circumstances, he was replaced by Stormzy. Tyler Joseph of Twenty One Pilots was pulled down into the crowd during their performance of "Car Radio", at Reading 2016 and their set was cut short.

2017

Main stage

NME/Radio 1 Stage

BBC Radio 1 Dance stage

The Pit/Lockup

Festival Republic stage

BBC Radio 1Xtra stage

Notes
The band PWR BTTM were lined-up to perform on The Lock Up stage, but after allegations went viral that band member Ben Hopkins had initiated sexual abuse, the festival pulled them from the line up. Several artists dropped out of Reading & Leeds for currently unknown reasons, this included Bishop Briggs, Katy B, A2 and K.I.D. On the first day of the festival, Royal Republic, who were the opening act on the main stage for Friday at Leeds, cancelled due to personal reasons, they were replaced by the Xcerts. Don Broco performed on The Lock Up stage under the name 'The Prettyboys' as a secret set. Queens of the Stone Age and Wolf Alice also had secret sets at the festival.

2018

Main stage

Radio 1 stage

BBC Radio 1 Dance stage

The Pit/The Lock Up

Festival Republic stage

BBC Radio 1 Xtra stage

Skepta was billed to headline the Radio 1 tent on Sunday but was removed from the lineup, with "logistical issues" being cited as the reason. He was not replaced, but Diplo was bumped up to headline rather than sub the stage. Other notable removals were Ski Mask The Slump God who pulled out due to touring commitments and was replaced by Bhad Bhabie and Brunswick who was also due to play the Dance Stage but was replaced by Madam X, Skinny Girl Diet were due to open the Radio 1 Stage on Sunday but were replaced by Twisted Wheel, Famous Dex was to play the Radio 1 Stage on Sunday but pulled out and Playboi Carti cancelled not long before the festival due to personal reasons. He was due to perform on the Radio 1 Stage.

2019

Main stage

Radio 1 stage

BBC Radio 1 Dance stage

The Pit/The Lock Up

Festival Republic stage

BBC Radio 1 Xtra stage

Notes

English indie rock band Blaenavon was to be a headlining act on the Festival Republic Stage, but on 20 June pulled out due to 'on-going health issues'. Crystal Fighters was announced as their replacement. G Flip, who was also due to perform on the Festival Republic Stage, also pulled out of the festivals for unknown reasons. UK drill rapper Loski has also been removed from the line-up. This may be because the rapper was arrested for being in possession with a firearm. Fellow UK drill rapper Unknown T was also removed after he was charged with murder and violent disorder after allegedly stabbing 20-year-old Steven Narvaez-Jara during a party. Geko was also supposed to perform on Radio 1Xtra Stage. It is unknown why he was removed. Brunswick who was also due to play on the Radio 1 Stage last year, was pulled from the line up again this year for unknown reasons. Two days before his performance at Leeds, Lil Uzi Vert pulled out of the festival for 'unforeseen circumstances'. Acts were pushed up, Yungblud and Mayday Parade swapped places, and SWMRS was upgraded from Festival Republic to the Main Stage. Comethazine and Masicka were replaced by DJ Grevious and M Huncho. King Princess was due to perform on the NME Stage, but had to pull out due to illness. Aitch was moved from the Radio 1Xtra tent, and took their slot. Drenge performed a secret slot on the BBC Introducing stage, Enter Shikari performed a secret acoustic slot on the same stage. This was the band's third set through the festival.

Juice Wrld was scheduled to perform at Reading on the Friday of the festival but a minute before his scheduled appearance, the crew announced that he had been cancelled due to "flight issues".

Blade Brown wasn't able to perform at Reading due to being stuck in traffic.

2020
The 2020 Festival was cancelled for health concerns due to the COVID-19 pandemic. The announced line-up was due to be:

Main stage

Radio 1 stage

Radio 1 Dance stage

The Pit/The Lock Up

Festival Republic stage

Radio 1Xtra stage

2021

2022

The 2022 Festival is due to be held on 26–28 August 2022. As of 21 August 2022, the announced line-up consists of the following.

Main Stage East

Main Stage West

BBC Radio 1 Dance stage

The Pit / Festival Republic Stage

BBC Radio 1Xtra stage

References

External links

Flickr Historical Line Up Posters

Line-Ups